Darya Paluektava (born 4 March 1993) is a Belarusian racewalker. In 2019, she competed in the women's 20 kilometres walk event at the 2019 World Athletics Championships held in Doha, Qatar. She finished in 14th place.

In 2020, she won the silver medal in the women's 10,000 metres walk at the 2020 Belarusian Athletics Championships held in Minsk, Belarus.

References

External links 
 

Living people
1993 births
Place of birth missing (living people)
Belarusian female racewalkers
World Athletics Championships athletes for Belarus
20th-century Belarusian women
21st-century Belarusian women